Benjamin Pwee Yek Kwan (born 1968) is a Singaporean politician, business development strategist and consultant. Formerly a government scholarship recipient and civil servant, Pwee is a member of the opposition Singapore Democratic Party (SDP).

Education 
Pwee studied at Raffles Institution and Raffles Junior College. A recipient of the Singaporean government's Overseas Merit Scholarship, he completed a Bachelor of Arts and Master of Arts in music and literature at the University of Cambridge. He also holds a Master of Public Administration from the Lee Kuan Yew School of Public Policy at the National University of Singapore and a Master of Science from the S. Rajaratnam School of International Studies at Nanyang Technological University. He also studied strategic management at the Harvard Business School and completed a master's degree in Christian studies at the China Graduate School of Theology in Hong Kong.

Civil service career 
Pwee worked in the civil service between 1990 and 1998 in the Foreign Affairs, Home Affairs and Defence ministries. From 1995 to 1998, he was first secretary for political and economic affairs at the Singaporean embassy in Beijing, where he served as an interpreter and note-taker during Lee Kuan Yew's visits to China.

Business career 
Pwee left the civil service in 1998 and became the executive director of Medical Services International. Five years later, he left for Hong Kong, where he started E-deo Asia, a consulting firm, and has been its managing director and principal consultant since then. During his time in Hong Kong, he worked part-time for two years in the Central Policy Unit, advising Chief Executive Donald Tsang. He also held Hong Kong permanent residency, having worked there for eight years as a consultant for multinational corporations.

In July 2020, Pwee joined law firm CNP Law LLP as its chief business development officer.

Political career

Singapore People's Party 
Pwee was a former chairman of the youth wing of the governing People's Action Party (PAP) in the Thomson area. In 2006, he was asked by his friend Wilfred Leung, a member of the opposition Singapore People's Party (SPP), to join the SPP. He initially turned down the offer, but accepted in 2011 after meeting SPP secretary-general Chiam See Tong and his wife Lina Loh.

During the 2011 general election, Pwee joined  a five-member SPP team to contest in Bishan–Toa Payoh GRC against a five-member PAP team. The SPP team lost after garnering 43.07% of the vote against the PAP team's 56.93%. Shortly after the election, on 13 May 2011, Pwee was named second assistant secretary-general of the SPP.

Democratic Progressive Party 
Pwee and five other SPP members left the party in January 2012, citing differences in opinion about party leadership styles and the party's future direction as reasons behind their leaving. In the second half of 2012, Pwee was approached by Seow Khee Leng, former leader of the opposition Democratic Progressive Party (DPP), who asked him to join the DPP. He was co-opted into the DPP as its acting secretary-general on 13 January 2013 and confirmed on 31 March 2013.

On 29 August 2015, ahead of the 2015 general election, the DPP and SPP signed an agreement to field a joint DPP–SPP team to contest in Bishan–Toa Payoh GRC. Under the agreement, Pwee had to resign from the DPP and join the SPP because electoral rules dictate that all candidates in a GRC team have to be from the same party, and Pwee had agreed to contest under the SPP banner. Pwee and the other four SPP candidates lost to the PAP team after garnering 26.41% of the vote against the PAP team's 73.59%.

Singapore Democratic Party 
In 2019, Pwee left the DPP and joined the Singapore Democratic Party (SDP). During the 2020 general election, he was part of a four-member SDP team contesting in Marsiling–Yew Tee GRC against a four-member PAP team. The SDP team lost after garnering 36.82% of the vote against the PAP team's 63.18%.

Personal life 
Pwee's father, Robert Pwee, was a People's Action Party (PAP) grassroots leader. Pwee is married and has three children.

Pwee is a Protestant Christian and has held positions at the Asia Theological Association and Graduates Christian Fellowship (Singapore).

Pwee started the Pwee Foundation in 2012 to sponsor social causes and connect beneficiaries with entities that can assist them, including voluntary welfare organisations, social enterprises and government agencies. He has also done voluntary work with the Singapore Anglican Community Services, Singapore Scout Association, two mental health rehabilitation institutions, a shelter for battered women and children, and a centre for autistic children.

References

Living people
1968 births
Singaporean civil servants
Raffles Institution alumni
Raffles Junior College alumni
Alumni of the University of Cambridge
National University of Singapore alumni
Singapore People's Party politicians
Singaporean politicians of Chinese descent
Singapore Democratic Party politicians
21st-century Singaporean businesspeople